Rail Road Flat (formerly, Independence Flat and Railroad Flat) is a census-designated place (CDP) in Calaveras County, California, United States. The population was 475 at the 2010 census, down from 549 at the 2000 census.

History
This historic mining town, elevation 2,600 feet (788 m), was named after primitive mule-drawn ore cars used here. There was never actually a railroad here. The town was established in 1849. It was the site of an Indian council as well as the center of rich placer and quartz mining. Its largest producer was the Petticoat Mine. The post office was established in 1857, closed in 1858, and re-established in 1869 and the Edwin Taylor store built in 1867. The town's population was decimated in 1880 by black fever.

The Clark Reservoir was created when an engineer named W.V. Clark constructed a ditch from the Mokelumne River, as there was not much water to work the placers. The reservoir, located on his property, supplied water to the mines and to the town.

The town is registered as California Historical Landmark #286.

Geography

Demographics

2010
The 2010 United States Census reported that Rail Road Flat had a population of 475. The population density was 14.3 people per square mile (5.5/km). The racial makeup of Rail Road Flat was 411 (86.5%) White, 0 (0.0%) African American, 15 (3.2%) Native American, 4 (0.8%) Asian, 2 (0.4%) Pacific Islander, 9 (1.9%) from other races, and 34 (7.2%) from two or more races.  Hispanic or Latino of any race were 41 persons (8.6%).

The Census reported that 475 people (100% of the population) lived in households, 0 (0%) lived in non-institutionalized group quarters, and 0 (0%) were institutionalized.

There were 220 households, out of which 41 (18.6%) had children under the age of 18 living in them, 101 (45.9%) were opposite-sex married couples living together, 15 (6.8%) had a female householder with no spouse present, 7 (3.2%) had a male householder with no spouse present.  There were 18 (8.2%) unmarried opposite-sex partnerships, and 0 (0%) same-sex married couples or partnerships. 72 households (32.7%) were made up of individuals, and 38 (17.3%) had someone living alone who was 65 years of age or older. The average household size was 2.16.  There were 123 families (55.9% of all households); the average family size was 2.79.

The population was spread out, with 77 people (16.2%) under the age of 18, 20 people (4.2%) aged 18 to 24, 70 people (14.7%) aged 25 to 44, 186 people (39.2%) aged 45 to 64, and 122 people (25.7%) who were 65 years of age or older.  The median age was 53.7 years. For every 100 females, there were 93.1 males.  For every 100 females age 18 and over, there were 95.1 males.

There were 340 housing units at an average density of 10.3 per square mile (4.0/km), of which 220 were occupied, of which 169 (76.8%) were owner-occupied, and 51 (23.2%) were occupied by renters. The homeowner vacancy rate was 2.9%; the rental vacancy rate was 10.5%.  363 people (76.4% of the population) lived in owner-occupied housing units and 112 people (23.6%) lived in rental housing units.

2000
As of the census of 2000, there were 549 people, 240 households, and 150 families residing in the CDP. The population density was 16.7 people per square mile (6.5/km). There were 326 housing units at an average density of 9.9 per square mile (3.8/km). The racial makeup of the CDP was 92.17% White, 0.18% Black or African American, 1.46% Native American, 0.91% Asian, 0.18% Pacific Islander, 1.82% from other races, and 3.28% from two or more races. 5.28% of the population were Hispanic or Latino of any race.

There were 240 households, out of which 20.0% had children under the age of 18 living with them, 47.9% were married couples living together, 9.6% had a female householder with no husband present, and 37.1% were non-families. 26.7% of all households were made up of individuals, and 10.0% had someone living alone who was 65 years of age or older. The average household size was 2.29 and the average family size was 2.72. Independence is an adjacent unincorporated community, that lies at an elevation of 2631 feet (802 m).

In the CDP, the population was spread out, with 19.5% under the age of 18, 5.8% from 18 to 24, 21.1% from 25 to 44, 35.3% from 45 to 64, and 18.2% who were 65 years of age or older. The median age was 47 years. For every 100 females, there were 99.6 males. For every 100 females age 18 and over, there were 94.7 males.

The median income for a household in the CDP was $35,938, and the median income for a family was $35,278. Males had a median income of $32,083 versus $28,750 for females. The per capita income for the CDP was $18,454. About 6.7% of families and 18.4% of the population were below the poverty line, including 24.7% of those under age 18 and 6.0% of those age 65 or over.

Politics

References

External links

Census-designated places in Calaveras County, California
California Historical Landmarks
Populated places established in 1849
Census-designated places in California
1849 establishments in California